Georgian is a Unicode block containing the Mkhedruli and Asomtavruli Georgian characters used to write Modern Georgian, Svan, and Mingrelian languages. Another lower case, Nuskhuri, is encoded in a separate Georgian Supplement block, which is used with the Asomtavruli to write the ecclesiastical Khutsuri Georgian script.

Mtavruli capitals are included in a separate Georgian Extended block, but the capital letters are not used for title casing.

Block

History
The following Unicode-related documents record the purpose and process of defining specific characters in the Georgian block:

References 

Unicode blocks